Jane de Gay is a British academic and lecturer who has earned an international reputation as an expert on the life and works of Virginia Woolf. de Gay's works on Woolf include a series of articles and a 2006 book, Virginia Woolf's Novels and the Literary Past, published by Edinburgh University Press. Her work has been recognised by the Virginia Woolf Society of Great Britain. She has co-edited four books on gender and theatre, including Languages of Theatre Shaped by Women (with Lizbeth Goodman).

de Gay is also an Anglican priest serving as Assistant Curate at St Martin's Church, Potternewton, Leeds.

Academia
She is Reader in English Literature and Programme Leader for the MA in Victorian Studies at Leeds Trinity University.

Quotes
“The invitation is a great honour, and I will be following in the footsteps of distinguished Woolf scholars Dame Gillian Beer and the late Professor Julia Briggs. I continue to work on Woolf, and the Virginia Woolf Birthday Lecture will draw on my new research into Woolf and Spirituality.”

Publications
Virginia Woolf's Novels and the Literary Past (2006) ; Paperback (2007)

References

External links
de Gay, Jane (2000). "An Unfinished Story: The Freshwater Drafts of 'The Searchlight'" (requires eNotes pass)

1966 births
Living people
Place of birth missing (living people)
Writers from London
English literary critics
Women literary critics
English non-fiction writers
People associated with Leeds Trinity University